"Somewhere in My Broken Heart" is a song written by American country music artist Billy Dean and Richard Leigh. Randy Travis first recorded the song on his 1989 album No Holdin' Back. Two years later, it was released as the third single from Dean's album Young Man and reached number 3 on the Billboard Hot Country Singles & Tracks chart.

Music video
The music video was directed by Bill Young and premiered in mid-1991, co-starring Margie Lazo.

Chart performance

Year-end charts

References

1989 songs
1991 singles
Randy Travis songs
Billy Dean songs
Songs written by Richard Leigh (songwriter)
Songs written by Billy Dean
Song recordings produced by Tom Shapiro
Capitol Records Nashville singles